Powertraveller International Ltd specialises in the design, development and manufacture of portable power products for charging digital electronic devices such as mobile phones, MP3 players and Laptops.  The company, based in Alton, Hampshire, United Kingdom, also developed a range of charging tips.

Awards
In April 2009, the company won the Queen's Award, Enterprise in the Innovation category for their entire range.  

In July 2009, the solargorilla, the company's solar panel for laptops won the OutDoor Award for Best Accessory.

In November 2009, the solargorilla won The Oldie Magazine's 'Don't Leave Home Without It' award for the best travel gadget and the Digital Communications category in the inaugural Government-backed iawards.

Technology companies of the United Kingdom
Companies based in Hampshire
Alton, Hampshire